Steven Daniel Reuther (November 2, 1951 – June 5, 2010) was an American producer and executive producer.

Life and career
Born in St. Petersburg, Florida, Reuther came to Los Angeles, California in the late 1970s. He landed his first job in the mailroom at William Morris Agency, quickly becoming the first assistant to Stan Kamen. Leveraging his relationship with Kamen, he worked with such stars as Donald Sutherland, Jon Voight, Goldie Hawn and Sally Field.

He became an expert in film finance and structured numerous movies, pioneering the use of Canadian tax structures.

Reuther served as VP of Galactic Films, where he helped develop Adrian Lyne's 9½ Weeks. He then segued to Vestron Pictures in 1986, serving as the executive producer of Dirty Dancing and other pictures. He then partnered with Arnon Milchan at New Regency developing pictures including Sidney Lumet's Family Business, and The War of the Roses. He went on to produce and executive produce more than 35 films in partnership with Milchan, including the 1990 smash Pretty Woman, which launched Julia Roberts. In March 1994, Reuther announced that he had formed a new film production company, Douglas/Reuther Productions, in partnership with Michael Douglas.

In 1998, Reuther created Bel-Air Entertainment, and served as its chairman and CEO. While at Bel-Air he was most proud of his movie Pay It Forward, whose title became entered everyday culture. He also shepherded Proof of Life, Sweet November, Rock Star and Collateral Damage.

His feature film credits include Dirty Dancing (1987), Pretty Woman (1990), Sommersby (1993), The Client (1994), and Face/Off (1997), The Rainmaker (1997) and Sweet November (2001)

Reuther died on June 5, 2010, after a battle with cancer at age 58. A memorial service was held at the Self-Realization Fellowship Lake Shrine.

Filmography
He was a producer in all films unless otherwise noted.

Film

Production manager

Thanks

Television

References

External links
 

1951 births
2010 deaths
American film producers
Deaths from cancer in California